Eton Wick is a ward in the Royal Borough of Windsor and Maidenhead, England, represented by one councillor (Peter Lawless) of the Conservative Party).

He admitted housing benefit fraud in August 2014 and was consequently suspended from the Borough's Conservative group.

As of 1 December 2011, there were 1,819 voters appearing on the electoral roll for the ward.

Past election results

References

Wards of the Royal Borough of Windsor and Maidenhead